Michelle Litjens (born September 28, 1972) is an American politician and businesswoman.

Background
Born in St. Louis, Missouri, she graduated from St. Mary Central High School and then from UW-Oshkosh with a degree in political science in 1995. She was a real estate builder and manager. Litjens lives in Neenah, Wisconsin.

Political career
She is a member of Wisconsin Right to Life, and the National Rifle Association. She was elected to the Wisconsin State Assembly in 2010. She served one term and did not seek re-election in 2012.

Notes

Politicians from St. Louis
Politicians from Neenah, Wisconsin
University of Wisconsin–Oshkosh alumni
Businesspeople from Wisconsin
Women state legislators in Wisconsin
1972 births
Living people
21st-century American politicians
21st-century American women politicians
Republican Party members of the Wisconsin State Assembly